Diego Ignacio Vela Vázquez (born 27 November 1991) is a Spanish professional footballer who plays for Atlético Arteixo as a right winger.

Club career
Born in A Coruña, Galicia, Vela joined the youth academy of local Deportivo de La Coruña at the age of 16, making his senior debut with the B team which competed in Tercera División and helping to promotion to Segunda División B in his first year. He signed a contract extension in July 2012, keeping him at the club for another season; primarily a right winger, he spent much of 2012–13 as a right back.

Vela moved to third-tier side Racing de Ferrol on 7 July 2013, after agreeing to a one-year deal as their first signing of the summer. His first official match took place on 25 August, starting in a 1–1 away draw against CD Tropezón. On 5 August 2014, he renewed his contract until June 2016.

In June 2016, after 106 competitive appearances, Vela moved abroad and joined Diósgyőri VTK in the Hungarian Nemzeti Bajnokság I. He first appeared in top-flight football on 23 July of that year, featuring 60 minutes in the 2–1 home win over Újpest FC.

Vela returned to both Spain and his native region in late December 2019, signing for fourth division club Bergantiños FC after a trial period. In summer 2021 he joined Racing Club Villalbés in the same league but, later that year, transferred to amateurs Atlético Arteixo.

Career statistics

References

External links

1991 births
Living people
Spanish footballers
Footballers from A Coruña
Association football wingers
Segunda División B players
Tercera División players
Divisiones Regionales de Fútbol players
Deportivo Fabril players
Racing de Ferrol footballers
Bergantiños FC players
Nemzeti Bajnokság I players
Diósgyőri VTK players
Spanish expatriate footballers
Expatriate footballers in Hungary
Spanish expatriate sportspeople in Hungary